Yang Eui-ji (born June 5, 1987) is a South Korean professional baseball catcher currently playing for the Doosan Bears of the KBO League. He has won the KBO League Golden Glove Award at catcher five times; three consecutive years from 2014 to 2016, and again back-to-back in 2018 and 2019. Yang won the Korean Series Most Valuable Player Award in 2016 and 2020.

Professional career
He graduated from Gwangju Jinheung High School and joined the Doosan Bears in the second draft in 2006 (59th in the 8th round). He joined the Police Baseball Team immediately after the 2007 season and was discharged from the Police Baseball Team in 2009. 

Yang won the KBO League Rookie of the Year Award in 2010 on the strength of his 20 home runs and 68 RBI.

Yang left the Bears after the 2018 season, signing as a free agent with the NC Dinos. He led the league in hitting in 2019 with a .354 batting average.

After the 2022 season, Yang returned to the Bears as a free agent on a four-year contract.

International career
Yang represented South Korea at the 2015 WBSC Premier12, 2017 World Baseball Classic, and 2018 Asian Games. He also represented the team at the 2023 World Baseball Classic.

References

External links
Career statistics and player information from the KBO League

1987 births
Living people
Sportspeople from Gwangju
Baseball players at the 2018 Asian Games
Asian Games gold medalists for South Korea
Medalists at the 2018 Asian Games
Asian Games medalists in baseball
Baseball players at the 2020 Summer Olympics
Doosan Bears players
NC Dinos players
KBO League catchers
KBO League Rookie of the Year Award winners
Korean Series MVPs
Olympic baseball players of South Korea
South Korean baseball players
2015 WBSC Premier12 players
2017 World Baseball Classic players
2023 World Baseball Classic players